The Salish peoples are indigenous peoples of the American and Canadian Pacific Northwest, identified by their use of the Salish languages which diversified out of Proto-Salish between 3,000 and 6,000 years ago.

The term "Salish" originated in the modern era as an exonym created for linguistic research.  Salish is an anglicization of Séliš, the endonym for the Salish Tribes of the Flathead Reservation.  The Séliš were the easternmost Salish people and the first to have a diplomatic relationship with the United States so their name was applied broadly to all peoples speaking a related language.

Salish language 

The Salish (or Salishan) people are in four major groups: Bella Coola (Nuxalk), Coast Salish, Interior Salish, and Tsamosan, who each speak one of the Salishan languages. The Tsamosan group is usually considered a subset of the broader Coast Salish peoples.

Among the four major groups of the Salish people, there are twenty-three documented languages. At least five of these are no longer in use, while the rest are seriously endangered. The majority of fluent Salish-speakers are elderly, and younger speakers are quite rare. In spite of this, there are ongoing efforts to keep the languages alive through revitalization programs planned and conducted by various tribal organisations. Currently, a team of scholars is conducting research on the languages in order to create reference material and educational resources.

Salish languages, especially those of the Coast peoples, are threatened primarily by assimilation. State programs such as the Canadian residential schools (where indigenous languages were prohibited) have been a major factor in reducing the number of fluent Salish speakers. Schools today, however, from the secondary to the university level, are actively promoting knowledge and use of the Salish languages.

Language and cultural revitalization 
In 1988, the Self Governance Demonstration Project of the Confederated Salish and Kootenai Tribes (the CSKT) was successful, and the U.S. government returned full autonomy to their tribal leadership in 1993. Over the following decades the CSKT has reverted to traditional governance in which Elders provide counsel, to the chief, on tribal policies, culture and education, and in turn tribal policies have grown out of a desire to strengthen the community's ties to their cultural heritage.

In a move to self-identify and push back against the effects of the Indian Termination policy, namely assimilation, in 2016 the tribe chose to change their name from the anglicized "Salish-Prend d'Oreille" to Séliš-Ql̓ispé. The change was part of a wider movement to include more Salishan in the community's daily lives.

For the Séliš-Ql̓ispé, language and culture are entwined — through oral histories, food practices, horticulture, environment, and spirituality. By reviving the language, they hope to also reclaim their identity, their health, and their culture.

Community efforts to revitalize the Salishan language and culture, aside from efforts to teach classes on language (in some cases, full-immersion into the language with no falling back onto English), include such things as virtual tours and museums, such as the Sq'éwlets, which is a Stó:lō-Coast Salish Community in the Fraser River Valley. There is also the People's Center Museum that opened in 1994 and hosts a rotating exhibition of Salish and Kootenai cultural artifacts. The museum is supplemented with an oral tradition of story-telling that explains the significance of the pieces on display and shares the stories of the people who lived in the time before and during the European invasion.

There have also been calls for repatriation of artifacts across all indigenous tribes of the Americas as additional efforts to reclaim history and culture.

Powwows 
The Arlee Espapqeyni Celebration is a yearly 4 July powwow hosted by the Confederated Salish and Kootenai Tribes and is located in Arlee, Montana. It runs for a period of several days and involves dance competitions and singing competitions (and non-competitive singing and drum performances).

In 1884 the BIA (Bureau of Indian Affairs) made it illegal for any Indian dances to be performed, and so the tribes danced in secret. A new, religiously-influenced dance called the Ghost Dance began spreading from tribe to tribe at a rate that the U.S. government was wary of, and in 1890 a military unit was dispatched to Wounded Knee to interrupt a ceremony of the Ghost Dance among the Sioux. Roughly 200 Sioux were gunned down in what is now known as the Wounded Knee Massacre.

Modern powwows came about after the armistice of World War 1, when Native American veterans returned home from war; celebrations were held for their homecoming and included traditional dances. A new sense of community also came into being with the end of the war, along with the proximity of reservations to one another, and the celebrations began to include neighboring tribes rather than remain exclusive to individual tribes.

When Plains Indians were resettled in urban areas following World War II, per the policy of the U.S. government, their culture and traditions went with them and became widely spread—which is why many powwow dances and songs are from the Plains tradition. This dispersal of people and culture into large community centers also tightened the inter-tribal networks that had come into existence after the first World War.

Art and material culture

Salish weaving 

Salish weavers used both plant and animal fibers. Coast Salish peoples kept flocks of woolly dogs, bred for their wool, to shear and spin the fibers into yarn. The Coast Salish would also use mountain goat wool, waterfowl down, and various plant fibers including cedar bark, nettle fiber, milkweed and hemp. They would combine these materials in their weaving. A type of white clay was pounded into the fibers, possibly for the purpose of extracting oil from the wool. Not all Salish blankets were made with dog's wool—commoners' blankets were usually made of plant fibers. The designs of Salish weavings commonly featured graphical patterns such as zig-zag, diamond shapes, squares, rectangles, V-shapes and chevrons.

In the early to mid-nineteenth century, the fur trade brought Hudson's Bay blankets to the Pacific Northwest. The influx of these cheaper, machine-made blankets led to the decline of native wool blankets that were expensive and labor-intensive to produce. Salish weaving continued to a lesser extent, but the weavers largely transitioned to using sheep's wool yarn brought to the area by traders, as it was less costly than keeping the salmon-eating woolly dogs.

There was a revival of Salish weaving in the 1960s, and the Salish Weavers Guild was formed in 1971.

Use of cedar 
Plentiful in the Pacific Northwest, the Western Red Cedar was a vital resource in Coast Salish peoples' lives. Canoes, longhouses, totem poles, baskets, mats, clothing, and more were all made using cedar.

Totem poles 
Totem poles were less common in Coast Salish culture than with neighboring non-Salish Pacific Northwest Coast peoples such as the Haida, Tsimshian, Tlingit, and Kwakiutl tribes. It wasn't until the twentieth century that the totem pole tradition was adopted by the northern Coast Salish peoples including the Cowichan, Comox, Pentlatch, Musqueam, and Lummi tribes. These tribes created fewer free-standing totem poles, but are known for carving house posts in the interior and exterior of longhouses.Salish peoples located in the Pacific Northwest and parts of Southern Alaska were known to build totem poles that were meant to symbolize a tribe member's spirit animal or family crest. They continue on this legacy today by selling hand carved totem poles formed in the same fashion.

Contemporary Salish artists 

 Susan A. Point is a Musqueam wood carver and glass artist. Her work "Musqueam Welcome Figures", inspired by Coast Salish house posts, is featured in the Vancouver International Airport.
 Matika Wilbur is a Swinomish and Tulalip photographer, and the creator of Project 562, which documents contemporary Native Americans from the 562 federally-recognized tribes in the United States.
Debra Sparrow is a Musqueam artist and weaver. Her weaving was featured in The Fabric of Our Land: Salish Weaving exhibit at the Museum of Anthropology in 2017-2018.
 Corwin Clairmont is a Salish Kootenai printmaker, and a conceptual and installation artist.

Subgroups and territory 

Salish people groups are subdivided by their respective branches of the Salishan language family: Coast Salish (peoples) speaking the Coast Salish languages, Interior Salish (peoples) speaking the Interior Salish languages, and the Nuxalk (Bella Coola) people speaking the Nuxalk language.

The Nuxalk are the northernmost Salish peoples, located in and around Bella Coola, British Columbia. This area is separated from the main continuous land area known to be populated by Salish peoples.

Below is a list of most, but not all, Salish tribes and bands, listed from north to south.

Coast Salish

Chehalis
Comox
Cowlitz
Cowichan
Halkomelem-speaking peoples
Homalco (Xwemalhkwu)
Klahoose
Klallam
Lushootseed-speaking peoples
Lummi
Musqueam
Nooksack
Pentlatch
Puyallup
Quinault
Saanich
Shishalh (Sechelt or Shíshálh)
Skokomish (Twana)
Squamish
Tillamook
Sliammon (Tla A'min)
Tsleil-Waututh
T'Sou-ke

Interior Salish
Northern
Secwepemc (Shuswap)
St'at'imc (Lillooet)
Nlaka'pamux (Thompson River people)
Southern
Okanagan-speaking peoples
Colville
Sanpoil
Syilx (Okanagan)
Sinixt
Nespelem
Methow
Entiat
Wenatchi
Sinkiuse-Columbia
Chelan people
Spokane people
Confederated Salish and Kootenai Tribes (Flathead)
Bitterroot Salish
Kutenai
Kalispel (Pend d'Oreille)
Coeur d'Alene people

See also
 Coast Salish peoples
Coast Salish Art

External links
 Coast Salish of Victoria, BC
Confederated Salish and Kootenai Tribes of the Flathead Reservation
The Fabric of Our Land: Salish Weaving Exhibit at UBC Museum of Anthropology

References 

Indigenous peoples of the Pacific Northwest
First Nations in British Columbia
Native American tribes in Idaho
Native American tribes in Montana
Native American tribes in Oregon
Native American tribes in Washington (state)